Peru is a town in Berkshire County, Massachusetts, United States. The population was 814 at the 2020 census.

History 
Originally known as Northern Berkshire Township Number 2 and including all of Hinsdale and part of Middlefield, the town was first settled in 1767 and was officially incorporated as Partridgefield in 1771. Originally named for Oliver Partridge, one of the three purchasers of the town (along with Governor Francis Bernard), the name was officially changed to Peru in 1806, on the suggestion of the Rev. John Leland, "because it is like the Peru of South America, a mountain town, and if no gold or silver mines are under her rocks, she favors hard money and begins with a P."

Geography
Peru lies on the eastern border of Berkshire County, and is bordered by Windsor to the north, Cummington to the northeast, Worthington to the east, Middlefield to the south, Washington to the southwest, and Hinsdale to the west.

Peru has the highest mean altitude in Massachusetts and, along with neighboring Windsor, is one of only two municipalities with a mean elevation above 2,000 feet. It lies on high ground in the Berkshire Hills, with three main peaks in the town. Much of Peru is forested, with a large portion of the northern third of town covered by a wildlife management area, and much of the southern third covered by the Peru and Middlefield State Forests. To the west of town, Ashmere Lake flows out into Bennett Brook, eventually reaching the East Branch of the Housatonic River. To the east, many brooks, including Trout Brook, flow south and east towards the Westfield River, part of the Connecticut River watershed (Trout Brook is actually one of the main sources of the river).

Peru is bisected by Massachusetts Route 143, passing from east to west. No other state roads pass through the town. The nearest bus stop is in the center of Hinsdale. The nearest coach and rail services can be found in Pittsfield, as can the closest regional airport (at Pittsfield Municipal Airport). The nearest national service is located at Bradley International Airport in Windsor Locks, Connecticut.

Demographics

As of the census of 2000, there were 821 people, 295 households, and 228 families residing in the town.  The town is the ninth-smallest of the 32 cities and towns in the county, and ranks 331st out of the 351 cities and towns in Massachusetts by population.

The population density is listed at 31.7 people per square mile (12.2/km2), ranking it 22nd in the county and 328th in the Commonwealth.  There were 378 housing units at an average density of 14.6 per square mile (5.6/km2).  The racial makeup of the town was 97.93% White, 0.24% African American, 0.12% Native American, 0.49% Asian, 0.12% from other races, and 1.10% from two or more races. Hispanic or Latino of any race were 0.12% of the population.

There were 295 households, out of which 38.0% had children under the age of 18 living with them, 64.7% were married couples living together, 7.5% had a female householder with no husband present, and 22.7% were non-families. 16.3% of all households were made up of individuals, and 5.1% had someone living alone who was 65 years of age or older.  The average household size was 2.78 and the average family size was 3.14.

In the town, the population was spread out, with 27.8% under the age of 18, 6.0% from 18 to 24, 31.1% from 25 to 44, 27.4% from 45 to 64, and 7.8% who were 65 years of age or older.  The median age was 37 years. For every 100 females, there were 107.3 males.  For every 100 females age 18 and over, there were 113.3 males.

The median income for a household in the town was $44,531, and the median income for a family was $51,071. Males had a median income of $35,469 versus $30,625 for females. The per capita income for the town was $18,636.  About 4.1% of families and 4.9% of the population were below the poverty line, including 7.3% of those under age 18 and 2.7% of those age 65 or over.

Government
Peru employs the open town meeting form of government, and is led by a board of selectmen. The town has its own services, including police and fire departments, but does not have its own post office (it shares its post office and ZIP code, 01235, with Hinsdale). The town's public library is connected to the regional library system.

On the state level, Peru is represented in the Massachusetts House of Representatives as part of the Second Berkshire district, represented by Paul Mark, which covers central Berkshire County, as well as portions of Hampshire and Franklin Counties. In the Massachusetts Senate, the town is part of the Berkshire, Hampshire and Franklin district, represented by Adam Hinds, which includes all of Berkshire County and western Hampshire and Franklin counties. The town is patrolled by B4 (Cheshire) Barracks of Troop B of the Massachusetts State Police.

On the national level, Peru is represented in the United States House of Representatives as part of Massachusetts's 1st congressional district, and has been represented by Richard Neal of Springfield since 2013. Massachusetts is currently represented in the United States Senate by senior Senator Elizabeth Warren and junior senator Ed Markey.

Education
Peru is one of the seven towns in the Central Berkshire Regional School District, the largest district (by land area) in the Commonwealth. Students in Peru attend the Kittredge Elementary School in neighboring Hinsdale for elementary school. All students in the district travel to Dalton to attend Nessacus Regional Middle School for sixth through eighth grades and Wahconah Regional High School for the high grades. There are no private schools in Peru, with the nearest being in the Pittsfield area.

The nearest community college is Berkshire Community College in Pittsfield.  The nearest state college is Massachusetts College of Liberal Arts in North Adams, and the nearest state university is the University of Massachusetts Amherst.

Notable people
 Amos Dresser (1812–1904), Protestant minister
 Seraph Frissell, M.D., (1840–1915), physician, medical writer

References

External links

Town of Peru, official website
Peru business guide
Peru Public Library
Berkshire Eagle: Peru

Towns in Berkshire County, Massachusetts
Towns in Massachusetts